Topeka is a town in Clearspring and Eden townships, LaGrange County, Indiana, United States. The population was 1,153 at the 2010 census. Topeka is located approximately eleven miles south of Shipshewana, Indiana.

Topeka is home to Faron Yoder, the star of the Rumspringa documentary made in 2002 entitled "Devil's Playground".

Topeka was likely so named because the landscape reminded settlers of Topeka, Kansas.

Geography
Topeka is located at  (41.538876, -85.540063).

Demographics

2010 census
As of the census of 2010, there were 1,153 people, 421 households, and 291 families living in the town. The racial makeup of the town was 94.4% White, 0.3% African American, 1.0% Asian, 1.6% from other races, and 2.7% from two or more races. Hispanic or Latino of any race were 3.6% of the population.

There were 421 households, of which 43.9% had children under the age of 18 living with them, 50.6% were married couples living together, 12.8% had a female householder with no husband present, 5.7% had a male householder with no wife present, and 30.9% were non-families. 26.8% of all households were made up of individuals, and 10.2% had someone living alone who was 65 years of age or older. The average household size was 2.74 and the average family size was 3.34.

The median age in the town was 29.6 years. 33.9% of residents were under the age of 18; 8.7% were between the ages of 18 and 24; 28.2% were from 25 to 44; 21% were from 45 to 64; and 8.2% were 65 years of age or older. The gender makeup of the town was 47.8% male and 52.2% female.

2000 census
As of the census of 2000, there were 1,159 people, 448 households, and 310 families living in the town. The racial makeup of the town was 95.34% White, 0.69% Asian, 1.38% from other races, and 2.59% from two or more races. Hispanic or Latino of any race were 2.67% of the population.

There were 448 households, out of which 37.7% had children under the age of 18 living with them, 49.8% were married couples living together, 12.9% had a female householder with no husband present, and 30.6% were non-families. 26.6% of all households were made up of individuals, and 8.3% had someone living alone who was 65 years of age or older. The average household size was 2.59 and the average family size was 3.10.

In the town, the population was spread out, with 31.1% under the age of 18, 11.4% from 18 to 24, 30.5% from 25 to 44, 17.1% from 45 to 64, and 9.9% who were 65 years of age or older. The median age was 29 years. For every 100 females, there were 95.8 males. For every 100 females age 18 and over, there were 95.1 males.

The median income for a household in the town was $37,105, and the median income for a family was $42,232. Males had a median income of $32,356 versus $23,542 for females. The per capita income for the town was $17,269. About 7.3% of families and 9.1% of the population were below the poverty line, including 11.7% of those under age 18 and 10.1% of those age 65 or over.

Education
Topeka has a public library, a branch of the La Grange County Public Library.

References

External links
 Town of Topeka, Indiana website

Towns in LaGrange County, Indiana
Towns in Indiana